State Route 452 (SR 452), also known as Bill France Boulevard, is a west–east state highway that runs along the border between Rutherford and Wilson counties in the middle part of the U.S. state of Tennessee.

It is primarily a service road for the Nashville Superspeedway, connecting I-840 with US 231/SR 10.

The route is named after NASCAR founder Bill France.

Route description 
SR 452' begins at an interchange with I-840 northeast of Smyrna in Rutherford County. The road travels to the east-southeast and crosses into Wilson County. Immediately after skirting along the southern edge of the Nashville Superspeedway, it curves to the south-southeast and re-enters Rutherford County. Then, it curves back to the east-southeast. After it crosses into Wilson County again, it meets its eastern terminus, an intersection with US 231/SR 10 (Murfreesboro Road).

Major intersections

See also

References 

452
Transportation in Rutherford County, Tennessee
Transportation in Wilson County, Tennessee